Orthaga is a genus of snout moths. It was described by Francis Walker in 1859.

Species
 Orthaga achatina (Butler, 1878)
 Orthaga aenescens
 Orthaga amphimelas
 Orthaga asbolaea
 Orthaga auroviridalis
 Orthaga basalis (Moore, 1888)
 Orthaga bipartalis
 Orthaga castanealis Kenrick, 1907
 Orthaga chionalis Kenrick, 1907
 Orthaga columbalis
 Orthaga confusa
 Orthaga cryptochalcis de Joannis, 1927
 Orthaga disparoidalis
 Orthaga durranti
 Orthaga ecphoceana
 Orthaga edetalis Strand, 1919
 Orthaga erebochlaena
 Orthaga euadrusalis Walker, 1858
 Orthaga eumictalis
 Orthaga euryzona
 Orthaga exvinacea
 Orthaga fuliginosa
 Orthaga fumida
 Orthaga fuscofascialis Kenrick, 1907
 Orthaga haemarphoralis
 Orthaga hemileuca Hampson, 1916
 Orthaga icarusalis (Walker, 1859)
 Orthaga irrorata
 Orthaga leucatma
 Orthaga leucolophota
 Orthaga lithochroa
 Orthaga mangiferae
 Orthaga melanoperalis
 Orthaga meyricki
 Orthaga mixtalis
 Orthaga molleri
 Orthaga olivacea Warren, 1891
 Orthaga onerata
 Orthaga phaeopteralis Lower, 1902
 Orthaga picta (Warren, 1895)
 Orthaga polyscia (Turner, 1913)
 Orthaga rhodoptila
 Orthaga roseiplaga
 Orthaga rubridiscalis
 Orthaga rudis (Walker, 1862)
 Orthaga semialba
 Orthaga semieburnea
 Orthaga seminivea
 Orthaga subbasalis
 Orthaga thyrisalis Walker, 1859
 Orthaga tritonalis (Walker, 1859)
 Orthaga umbrimargo de Joannis, 1927
 Orthaga vitialis (Walker, 1859)

References

Epipaschiinae
Pyralidae genera